Jalan Kembali: Bohsia 2 is a 2012 Malaysian Malay-language action film directed by Syamsul Yusof. It is the sequel to Bohsia: Jangan Pilih Jalan Hitam.

Cast
 Syamsul Yusof as Muz
 Salina Saibi as Amy
 Nabila Huda as Tasha
 Zizan Razak as Ejan
 Soffi Jikan as Keting
 Harun Salim Bachik as Bomoh
 Hetty Sarlene as Ati
 Mak Jah as Rocky 
 Serina Redzuawan as Nora
 Kazar Saisi as Abu
 Delimawati as Makcik Tasha 
 Angeline Tan as Tauke
 Rose Iskandar as Ustazah

External links
 

Malaysian action films
2012 films
Skop Productions films
Grand Brilliance films
Films directed by Syamsul Yusof
Films with screenplays by Syamsul Yusof
Films produced by Yusof Haslam